Keith Miller was selected for the 1956 Ashes tour. The team travelled to England aboard the Himalaya in March. He was not called upon to bowl and scored a duck in the first match against the Duke of Norfolk's XI at Arundel Castle, a non-first-class festival match, as Australia scraped home by three wickets.

However, on attempting to bowl in the nets in preparation for the first-class fixtures, he felt back pain again and was forced to see a specialist who told him to not bowl for a month because of fractured cartilage. Miller was rested for the opening first-class match against Worcestershire.

For the following match, captain Ian Johnson was rested and Miller skippered the Australians against Leicestershire. The hosts were bowled out for 298 and Miller opted not to bowl himself during the match because of injury. Coming in at 3/175, Miller combined in two double-century partnerships. He put on 230 for the fifth wicket with Peter Burge (99) and 203 for the sixth wicket with Ron Archer (88). He ended with his highest first-class score of 281 not out, striking 35 fours and a six in six and a half hours of batting. Australia compiled reached 6/694 when time ran out and the match ended in a draw.

After being rested in the following match against Yorkshire, Miller returned to action against Nottinghamshire, where he made 10 before being run out as Australia amassed 8/547. The home side responded with 345 and the match petered out into a draw with Australia at 1/53.

However, a tougher fight awaited against Surrey at The Oval, who had England's Test spin combination of Jim Laker and Tony Lock. Miller came in at 3/124 to join Colin McDonald and struggled, scoring 18 runs in his first 120 minutes; it was the slowest two hours of scoring in his career, featuring much pad play as he attempted to play Laker from the crease, and stretching forward with his long arms when necessary. Such was Miller's watchfulness that he only scored 21 of 97 runs as Australia lost 6/97 to be 9/217, whereas he was normally an attacking batsman. As his partners continued to fall, Miller accelerated and scored 36 of the 42 runs in the last-wicket partnership with Jack Wilson in half an hour. He cut loose in two consecutive overs from Lock, taking 11 and 14 respectively. He ended unbeaten on 57 as Australia were bowled out for 259; Laker taking all ten wickets. Surrey then scored 347. Miller fell to Lock for two in the second innings as Australia collapsed as lost 9/34 for 107. Such was the spin-friendly nature of the surface that Surrey's new ball pairing bowled only three overs before Laker and Lock took over. During the match, the home team's spin pairing bowled more than 65% of the overs, something that was to be repeated throughout the summer. Surrey then compiled the 20 runs required for victory, inflicting a ten-wicket defeat, Australia's first loss to a county since 1912. Following the loss, sections of the Australian media, led by Jack Fingleton, began campaigning for Miller to replace Johnson as captain.

Miller was rested for the next match against Cambridge University, which Australia won. He returned to face Lancashire at Old Trafford, where he made 10 before being trapped by Brian Statham as Australia made 160 to take a 52-run first innings lead. He bowled for the first time on tour during the second innings, taking 1/10 from eight overs as the hosts declared at 6/238 and the match ended in a draw.

This was followed by a match against the Marylebone Cricket Club at Lord's, in which England fielded a virtual Test lineup. After making six, bowled by Fred Titmus in Australia's first innings of 413, Miller bowled 22 overs without incident, ending with 2/56 as the MCC reached 9/203 at the end of the rain-affected match. The pace burden increased when Davidson broke his ankle.

Miller started the match against Oxford University poorly. He was wicketless in the first innings and scored a duck as Australia took a 77-run lead. He bounced back to take 4/30 in the second innings, removing the last four wickets as Oxford fell from 6/158 to 191. Miller was not required to bat in the second innings as Australia completed an eight-wicket victory.

Australia'a last match before the First Test was against Sussex. Miller scored 26 and took 2/64 and two catches as the match barely reached the second innings after the hosts took a 67-run first innings lead.

By the First Test at Trent Bridge, Miller was shouldering the largest bowling load among the Australians. Lindwall and Davidson broke down during the first innings, with groin injury and chipped ankle bone respectively. Miller sent down 52 overs, almost one third of Australia's overs with the ball, in a match that lost two days' play to rain. Miller took 4/69 from 33 overs as England batted first and declared at 8/217. England started strongly to reach 2/180 when Miller had Peter Richardson caught behind. He then removed captain Peter May, followed by wicket-keeper Godfrey Evans two runs later, both caught behind, before removing Lock.

Miller struggled with the bat, making a duck, trapped by Laker as Australia were bowled out for 148. With Lindwall and Davidson unable to bowl, Miller took 2/58 as England declared at 3/188 and set Australia a target of 258 in four hours. Australia struggled for one hour before Miller came to the crease with the score at 2/18. He struggled for 46 minutes in making four and again fell lbw to Laker, with the score at 3/41. He had been unsure as to how to play Laker and played far off the back foot and took guard outside leg stump. Australia ended at 3/120 when stumps were drawn.

Immediately after the Test, Australia struggled in a tour match against Northamptonshire. Miller was not called upon to bowl following his toil in the First Test as the hosts declared at 3/339. In contrast, Australia were struggling at 5/154 when Miller came to the crease. He scored 72, featuring in a 117-run seventh-wicket partnership with Archer as Australia recovered to 314. Northamptonshire were then dismissed for 171 with Miller again not bowling, but Australia stumbled to 6/98 when time ran out. Miller was run out for 20.

Miller was rested from the drawn match against Kent immediately before the Second Test. Australia was still to win a match against a county side during the tour.

The teams headed to Lord's where Miller had to carry the pace attack without the injured Davidson and Lindwall. Pat Crawford and medium pace all rounder Ken Mackay were called in to make their debut and support Miller and Ron Archer with the pace duties. Australia batted first and Miller managed to repel a late attack by Trueman and Brian Statham to end the first day on 18. However, he was bowled the next day by a Trueman inswinger for 28. Australia managed only 285 and Crawford injured himself after 29 balls. The burden on Miller—who was already vulnerable to injury—grew. Miller beat Peter Richardson several times before having him caught behind, and then bowled Tom Graveney with an inswinger. England were 2/32 and their captain Peter May received an inswinger from Miller first ball, which he inside edged onto his stumps. However, the bail vibrated but was not dislodged. England survived to be 3/74 at stumps. On the third morning, Miller beat May four times and then had Watson caught in the gully in his third over. He then removed his old sparring partner Bailey for 32 to end the innings after removing Trueman one run earlier. Miller's 5/72 was largely responsible for England falling for 171. He had bowled almost unchanged, delivering 34.1 of 82.1 overs. Miller's former rival and England captain Len Hutton said "I cannot remember seeing Miller bowl better or with more vicious purpose...He was bowling firmly, with imagination and accuracy, and no two balls were alike". Miller's former captain Lindsay Hassett said "His length was perfect and he varied his pace while he cut both towards and in from the slips".

Australia was in difficulty at 5/79 when Miller came to bat, he struck a counterattacking 30, with seven fours, before being caught behind off the bowling of Trueman in his last innings at Lord's. Australia recovered from 6/115 at stumps to finish at 257 to set England 371 to win. He then removed Graveney for 18 at the start of the run chase. Resuming the next morning, he bowled Watson from a full toss. After lunch, he had May and Evans both caught behind. He bowled Johnny Wardle and completed his only ten-wicket match haul in Test. England had lost their last four wickets for 11 as Australia won by 185 runs. Miller had bowled 70.1 overs for the match, and more than a third of the overs in the second innings. His knee had taken a heavy toll and Johnson gave him the next ten days away from cricket. Despite Australia's success, Miller's triumph and Johnson's effort in bowling only four overs and scoring 23, led to more calls for a change of captain.

As a result, Miller missed the matches against Yorkshire, Gloucestershire and Somerset. It was not until the match against Gloucestershire that Australia won its first match against county opposition on the tour. The other two matches were drawn.

Miller returned for the match against Hampshire, the last before the Third Test. He scored only three and six not out and took match figures of 1/56 from 25 overs while acting as captain, before experiencing more knee trouble in a drawn match.

As a result, Miller had to play purely as a batsman in the Third Test on a spinning pitch at Headingley. Australia were caught on a wet wicket in response to England's 325, and Miller came to the crease at 4/59 late on the second day. Laker then removed Archer and Mackay to leave Australia at 6/69. Resuming at 6/81 the following morning, Miller and Benaud added 73 to take the score to 6/142 before Benaud fell, prompting a collapse in which Australia lost its last four wickets for the addition of a solitary run. Miller battled for 130 minutes to equal top-score with 41 before being bowled while attempting to sweep Laker's slower ball. Australia were all out for 143 and forced to follow on, 182 runs behind. In the second innings, Miller joined Neil Harvey with the score at 2/45. After failing to disperse the English fielders by hitting out, Miller attempted to keep Laker and Lock at bay, using his pads to avoid having to play a shot. At one stage, Laker bowled 10 overs for only five runs. Australia reached 2/93 at stumps, with Harvey on 40 and Miller on 24. Miller had struck two sixes late in the day from Lock. The next day, Miller fell for 26 to Laker for the second time in the match, caught in the leg trap. This prompted a collapse as Australia lost 8/32 to be all out for 140, losing by an innings, for the first time in a Test in 18 years. In both innings, when Miller fell, Australia suffered a batting collapse against Laker and Lock, who took 18 wickets between them.

The Australian press attacked the team, and called for changes, including the omission of the captain, Johnson. Acerbic cricket pundit and former Test cricketer and team-mate Sid Barnes called Johnson "Australia's non-playing captain".  Bill Ferguson, the Australian team's scorer, was also critical: "Had Johnson been told by his friends in the press that he was, in fact, a passenger, he might have pondered on the advisability of standing down. [...] There would have been no shame in standing down." Johnson, Miller and Gil Langley were the tour selectors. Langley and Miller were willing to omit Johnson, but only if the captain volunteered to stand aside. Johnson did not volunteer, so the others did not discuss the topic. The only change occurred when Miller proposed the replacement of Peter Burge with Ian Craig. This change came after a long silence between the trio as they waited for the others to bring up Johnson's form. Writing after the tour, Miller stated "Privately I thought that [Johnson] was not a form selection.  On the other hand, I did not think it wise to change skippers in midstream."  Miller and Johnson had both been appointed as Members of the Order of the British Empire (MBE) in the 1956 New Year Honours, and between the Tests they attended their formal investiture.

Miller was rested for the two matches before the Fourth Test, which were against the Club Cricket Conference (a non-first-class match) and Middlesex.

The groundsman at Old Trafford had been ordered to prepare a dusty, spinning pitch that was devoid of grass for the Fourth Test. A win for England would see them retain the Ashes. England's chairman of selectors and former captain Gubby Allen thought that the pitch would fall apart by tea on the first morning; the surface had already cracked before the start of play. When the curator asked Allen if he would like the remaining grass removed, he indicated that he would not be sad if it happened, so the groundsmen cut what remained of the grass. The umpires felt that the match would be over within three days. Miller bowled 21 wicketless overs for 41 runs as England amassed 459 on the deteriorating and crumbling pitch. Australia began batting after lunch on the second day, and the pace pair of Brian Statham and Trevor Bailey only bowled then overs to remove the shine from the ball before Laker and Lock took over.

Laker dismissed Miller for six, his only scoring shot being a strike over the fence. Australia fell from 0/48 to be all out for 84, with Laker taking 9/37. Australia were forced to follow on and Miller was tormented for 15 minutes before being bowled for a duck by Laker, who took an unprecedented 10/53 at Test level to take a world record 19 wickets as Australia lost by an innings and 170 runs. Australia's misery was compounded by regular rain interruptions during their innings, which turned the pitch into a sticky wicket. Wisden reported that the Australians were said "to be extremely bitter over the condition of the pitch". Former Test cricketer and journalist Bill O'Reilly wrote "This pitch is a complete disgrace" while opening batsman Colin McDonald later said, "England cheated: if by cheating you include the practise of preparing wickets to suit your own purpose." During the Tests at Headingley and Old Trafford, Laker and Lock bowled two thirds of the overs and took 38 of the 40 Australian wickets.

The Test was immediately followed by a match against Surrey, meaning that Australia would have to face Laker and Lock again. Again, Surrey bowled their pacemen for only ten overs before the spinners took over. Miller then scored 11 as Australia made 143, again falling to Laker on a wet wicket. Miller struck back, taking the first four wickets to reduce Surrey to 4/52, his scalps including May and fellow Test batsman Ken Barrington. He returned to take the wicket of Surrey captain Stuart Surridge and ended with 5/84 as the hosts were restricted to a 38-run lead. He did not bat in the second innings before time ran out with Australia still at 3/47 in a rain-interrupted match.

Miller missed the win over Glamorgan before returning to lead the team against Warwickshire as Johnson was rested. He had received death threats in the lead-up to the game, ordering him to lose. He scored 46 not out as Australia amassed 4/424 declared before taking 2/13 as Australia skittled their hosts for 194. Enforcing the follow on, Miller declined to bowl as Australia bowled the home team out by 103 to win by an innings and 127 runs. After scoring a duck and taking 1/49 in the first innings, Miller took 5/29 in the second innings against Derbyshire as the home team fell 51 runs short. He took three of the first four wickets to reduce the hosts to 4/24 before returning to take the last two wickets as Derbyshire were dismissed for 161. Miller was then rested for the match against Lancashire before returning against Essex for Australia's last match before the Fifth Test. He scored 50 as Australia compiled 349, after taking 3/35 in the first innings, bowling all of his victims, before taking 2/43 in the second as Australia won by an innings and 12 runs.

On the eve of the Fifth Test at The Oval, Miller announced that the tour would be his last, so that he would retire from cricket after the tour of the Indian subcontinent on the return voyage. In doing so, Miller had violated the Australian Board of Control's policy against players making media comment during a tour, so he was fined 100 pounds. Miller's close friend and England batsman Denis Compton had recovered from a knee injury and was selected, and their final clash at Test level was the subject of much media speculation.

In his final Test on English soil, Miller removed Richardson and David Sheppard to leave England at 2/66, before Compton and May took the score to 2/222. England then lost 8/25 and Miller finished with 4/91 as England were bowled out for 247 in their first innings. Miller came in to bat at 4/35 on a wet wicket and lofted Laker for a six, before proceeding to sweep anything that the off spinner delivered on a leg stump line. This helped Australia recover to 202, 45 runs in arrears, with Miller top-scoring with 61. He took another the wicket of Sheppard in the second innings as England made 3/182 across several rain-interrupted days, before May declared and set Australia 228 to win in two hours. Australia collapsed again and Miller came in for his last Test innings in England at 3/5. He ended unbeaten on seven when stumps were drawn at 5/27, after batting defensively for 66 minutes. The series ended 1–2. He ended the series with 201 runs at 22.55 and topped the bowling with 21 wickets at 22.23.

The tour ended with four more matches and Miller played in all of them. He scored 17 as Australia reached 8/226 before the match against the Gentlemen of England at Lord's was washed out with not even one innings completed. Johnson had let Miller captain the team in his final appearance at Lord's but it was marked by a black eye sustained when he edged a bouncer into his face. He was eventually out hit wicket.

He then made 13 and nine not out and took match figures of 1/27 as the tourists overcame TN Pearce's XI by five wickets at Scarborough. England had fielded a Test-level team apart from the absence of Laker and Lock.

The tour ended with two fixtures that were not first-class, against Minor Counties and Scotland. Miller scored 31 and three and conceded a total of 71 runs without taking a wicket as Australia won both matches, with Miller captaining in the first match.

Miller topped the first-class bowling averages for the Australians with 50 wickets at 19.60. He scored 843 runs at 36.63. Were it not for his double century against Leicestershire, he would have averaged less than 25 with the bat.

Miller cited family reasons, a career in the media, and a desire to retire before being pushed for his retirement.

See also 
Keith Miller with the Australian cricket team in England in 1948
Keith Miller with the Australian cricket team in England in 1953

References

Notes

Keith Miller